Alex Matshameko (born 22 October 1979) is a Botswanan footballer who currently plays as a defender for Botswana Meat Commission FC. He played two matches for the Botswana national football team in 2005. Matshameko made a substitute's appearance in a 0–4 2008 Africa Cup of Nations qualifying loss to Mauritana.

References

External links
 

Association football defenders
Botswana footballers
Botswana international footballers
1979 births
Living people
Gilport Lions F.C. players